François Louis Alfred Durrieu (18 January 1812, Hamburg - 27 September 1877, Paris).

Nephew of General Antoine Simon Durrieu and heir of the title of Baron in 1862. Student of the Special Military School of Saint-Cyr, he became captain in 1840 and was attached to topographical work in Algeria. Squadron Leader to Spahis in 1845, lieutenant colonel in 1st hunters in May 1849 colonel 2 e Spahis in July 1851, on 29 August 1854 he became brigadier general. He received the command of the subdivision of Mascara; then promoted to Major-General on 11 December 1859. He held the post of Deputy Governor of Algeria from 19 November 1866 until the abolition of that post on 24 October 1870. 

He was governor of Algeria from 27 July 1870 to 24 October 1870.

References 

1812 births
1877 deaths
French colonial governors and administrators
19th-century French military personnel
French generals
Governors general of Algeria
Military personnel from Hamburg